Finzi is a surname. Notable people with the name include:

 Aldo Finzi (politician) (1891–1944), Italian politician
 Aldo Finzi (composer) (1897–1945), Italian composer
 Bruno Finzi (1899–1974), Italian mathematician, engineer, and physicist
 Gerald Finzi (1901–56), British composer
 his wife, Joy Finzi (1907–1991), British artist 
 his son, Christopher Finzi (1934–2019), British conductor
 Finzi Trust, founded in 1969 to further the music, ideals and work of Gerald Finzi
 Giuseppe Finzi (1815-1886), Italian politician
 Graciane Finzi (born 1945), French composer
 Itzhak Fintzi (Izko Finzi), (born 1933), Bulgarian film and stage actor
 Mario Finzi (1913–1945), Italian magistrate, judge, and pianist who died in Auschwitz-Birkenau
 Mordechai Finzi (c. 1407–1476), Jewish mathematician, astronomer, grammarian, and physician in Mantua
 Samuel Finzi (born 1966), German actor

See also 
 The Garden of the Finzi-Continis, a historical novel by the Italian novelist Giorgio Bassani about the Finzi-Contini family
 The Garden of the Finzi-Continis (film), an adaptation of the novel directed by Vittorio de Sica
 Giuseppina Finzi-Magrini (18781944), Italian soprano